The 2019 OSU Cowboys football team represented Oklahoma State University in the 2019 NCAA Division I FBS football season. The Cowboys played their home games at Boone Pickens Stadium at Stillwater, Oklahoma, and competed in the Big 12 Conference. They were led by 15th-year head coach Mike Gundy.

Preseason

Coaching changes
In January 2019, head coach Mike Gundy announced the hiring of Sean Gleeson to be the new offensive coordinator, replacing Mike Yurcich, who left to take an assistant coaching position at Ohio State. Gleeson was previously the offensive coordinator at Princeton, where he coached the highest-scoring offense in FCS in 2018.

Recruiting
Oklahoma State signed a total of 21 recruits in its 2019 class. The class was ranked at No. 37 in the nation and fifth in the Big 12 Conference according to the 247Sports.com Composite.

Big 12 media poll
The 2019 Big 12 media days were held July 15–16, 2019 in Frisco, Texas. In the Big 12 preseason media poll, Oklahoma State was predicted to finish in fifth in the standings.

Preseason All-Big 12 teams
To be released

Schedule
Oklahoma State began the year with three non-conference games: on the road to play Oregon State of the Pac-12 Conference, at home against McNeese State of the Southland Conference, and on the road against Tulsa of the American Athletic Conference. In Big 12 Conference play, the Cowboys will play five home games against Kansas State, Baylor, TCU, Kansas, and Oklahoma; and four road games against Texas, Texas Tech, Iowa State, and West Virginia.

Source:

Roster

Game summaries

at Oregon State

vs. McNeese State

at Tulsa

at Texas

vs. Kansas State  

Oklahoma State's Chuba Hubbard ran for 296 yards, averaging 11.8 per attempt in a leading effort to hand Kansas State their first loss of the season.  Coming into the game, Kansas State was #7 in team rushing and averaged 280 yards  Oklahoma State's defense contributed well to the win as they held Kansas State to just 126 rushing yards, with only 18 of those yards in the first half.

Kansas State worked on a fourth-quarter comeback, but Oklahoma State was able to control the clock and win the game 26-13.

at Texas Tech

vs. Baylor

at Iowa State

vs. TCU

Chuba Hubbard ran for a total of 223 yards, including two long second-half touchdowns in the victory.

vs. Kansas

at West Virginia

vs. Oklahoma

vs. Texas A&M (Texas Bowl)

Statistics

Scoring
Scores against non-conference opponents

Scores against the Big 12

Scores against all opponents

Rankings

References

Oklahoma State
Oklahoma State Cowboys football seasons
Oklahoma State Cowboys football